Human the Death Dance is the third solo studio album by American rapper Sage Francis. It was released on Epitaph Records on May 8, 2007. It peaked at number 97 on the Billboard 200 chart.

Critical reception

At Metacritic, which assigns a weighted average score out of 100 to reviews from mainstream critics, the album received an average score of 77, based on 16 reviews, indicating "generally favorable reviews".

David Jeffries of AllMusic gave the album 4 stars out of 5, saying, "Human the Death Dance may be his most personal effort, but it's also an incredibly well-built full-length -- even when it borrows from a handful of genres -- and it's arguably his best lyrical effort, undoubtedly his best production-wise." Roque Strew of Pitchfork gave the album a 7.9 out of 10, saying, "'Going Back to Rehab' weaves allusions to the greats, Nas and Biggie, into a six-minute tapestry that encompasses everything great about Sage Francis's strongest album to date: Its neon rainbow of tones and moods, the almost telepathic harmony between producer and rapper, the riveting fault-line tiptoe between memoir and manifesto."

Track listing

Personnel
Credits adapted from liner notes.

 Sage Francis – vocals, arrangement, executive production
 Odd Nosdam – production (2)
 Mr. Cooper – production (3)
 Buck 65 – production (4)
 Mark Isham – production (5, 11)
 Alias – production (6, 7, 10)
 Sixtoo – production (8)
 Ant – production (9)
 Big Cats! – production (12)
 Kurtis SP – production (13)
 Miles Bonny – production (14)
 Reanimator – production (15), turntables (3, 15, 16)
 Jolie Holland – fiddle (4), vocals (4, 12)
 Nathan Harrop – harmonica (4)
 Eaters – vocals (6)
 Christopher Sneddon – synthesizer (6)
 B. Dolan – vocals (9)
 Buddy Wakefield – vocals (10, 13)
 Roughneck Jihad – vocals (14)
 DJ Orator – turntables (14)
 Bryan Lewis Saunders – vocals (16)
 Tom Inhaler – guitar (16), bass guitar (16), piano (16)
 Laura Escudé – violin (16)
 Scott Begin – drums (16)
 Gene Grimaldi – mastering

Charts

References

External links
 
 

2007 albums
Sage Francis albums
Epitaph Records albums
Albums produced by Alias (musician)
Albums produced by Ant (producer)
Albums produced by Odd Nosdam